Ryūzaki may refer to:

Sakuno Ryuzaki and Sumire Ryuzaki of The Prince of Tennis
 Dinosaur Ryuzaki of Yu-Gi-Oh!
 The most common alias of L of Death Note
 Umi Ryuuzaki of Magic Knight Rayearth
 Kazuya Ryuuzaki of Daimos
 Strider Ryūzaki of Strider (NES video game)